Tegan Ann McGrady (born October 11, 1997) is an American professional soccer player who plays as a defender for Portland Thorns FC of the National Women's Soccer League.

Early life
McGrady was raised in San Jose, California and attended Santa Teresa High School. While at Santa Teresa, she was a three-sport student-athlete who competed in track and field and tennis in addition to soccer. During her sophomore year, McGrady was suspended from high school play by the California Interscholastic Federation and missed games in the CIF Central Coast Section playoffs for participation in unsanctioned United States women's national soccer team camp games.

McGrady later attended Stanford University and played for the Stanford Cardinal women's soccer team. She was a member of the 2017 national championship team.

Club career

Washington Spirit
Washington Spirit drafted McGrady with the No. 7 overall pick in the 2019 NWSL College Draft and subsequently signed her to a standard contract on March 4, 2019.

McGrady spent much of her rookie season struggling with injuries and made only 6 appearances, 5 of them starts.

Her second NWSL season was abbreviated due to the COVID-19 pandemic; however, McGrady started in all five of the Spirit's 2020 NWSL Challenge Cup matches. McGrady missed the 2020 NWSL Fall Series due to a foot injury.

In October 2020, the Spirit re-signed McGrady to a new two-year contract with a club option for an additional 12 months.

San Diego Wave FC 
San Diego Wave FC announced that the club had acquired the rights to McGrady ahead of the expansion team's inaugural season in 2022. She made 10 appearances for the team.

Portland Thorns FC 
On July 25, 2022, Portland Thorns FC announced that the club had traded defender Madison Pogarch to San Diego in exchange for McGrady.

International career
McGrady was a member of multiple United States Soccer Federation youth teams throughout her childhood and joined the United States women's national under-17 soccer team in 2013. She went on to make 11 appearances, starting all of them, and assisted on 5 goals in 818 minutes of play. In 2014, she appeared in a further 3 games, starting 2, accruing 210 minutes.

McGrady joined the United States women's national under-20 soccer team in 2016 and made 3 appearances, starting 2, for 210 minutes. In 2017, she progressed to the United States women's national under-23 soccer team and made 3 appearances, all starts, and contributed 2 assists in 258 minutes played.

McGrady made her senior national team debut for the United States on April 8, 2018, against Mexico, as a 58th minute substitute replacing Mallory Pugh.

Honors 
Portland Thorns FC

 NWSL Championship: 2022

Washington Spirit FC NWSL Championship  2021

References

External links
US Soccer profile
Stanford profile
Washington Spirit profile
Portland Thorns FC profile
NWSL profile

 

1997 births
Living people
American women's soccer players
African-American women's soccer players
United States women's international soccer players
Women's association football defenders
Stanford Cardinal women's soccer players
Soccer players from San Jose, California
Santa Teresa High School alumni
Washington Spirit draft picks
Washington Spirit players
San Diego Wave FC players
Portland Thorns FC players
National Women's Soccer League players
21st-century African-American sportspeople
21st-century African-American women